Kiesa may refer to:

Nicolas Kiesa (born 1978), racing driver from Denmark
Kiesza (born 1989), stage name of Kiesa Rae Ellestad, Canadian singer-songwriter and dancer